18 Months is the third studio album by Scottish DJ and musician Calvin Harris. It was released on 26 October 2012 by Deconstruction, Fly Eye and Columbia Records. It marked Harris's first album where he does not regularly provide vocals on each song, instead producing the music and having guest singers sing for him, as Harris stated in late 2010 he did not intend to sing on his songs anymore. The album also shows a shift from Harris' usual nu disco-style songs, focusing more on an electro house style.

18 Months debuted at number one on the UK Albums Chart, earning Harris his second consecutive number-one album on the chart. It had sold over 923,000 copies in the United Kingdom as of July 2017. The album includes the singles "Bounce", "Feel So Close", "Let's Go", "We'll Be Coming Back", "Sweet Nothing", "Drinking from the Bottle", "I Need Your Love" and "Thinking About You", all of which, along with "We Found Love" featuring Rihanna, reached the top 10 of the UK Singles Chart, making 18 Months the first album in history to spawn nine top-10 singles. The songs "Let's Go" and "Sweet Nothing" were nominated for Best Dance Recording at the 55th and 56th Grammy Awards, respectively.

Singles
"Bounce" was released as the album's lead single on 10 June 2011, featuring American R&B singer Kelis. The song peaked at number two in the United Kingdom, number six in Ireland and number seven in Australia.

The second single "Feel So Close" was released on 19 August 2011, reaching number two in the United Kingdom and Ireland, and number seven in Australia. The song also became Harris's first solo single to chart on the Billboard Hot 100 in the United States, reaching number 12.

"Let's Go" was released as the album's third single on 30 March 2012, and it features American R&B singer Ne-Yo. It peaked at number two in the United Kingdom, number six in Ireland and number 17 in Australia and the US. "Let's Go" received a nomination for Best Dance Recording at the 55th Grammy Awards in 2013. The track was used in Pepsi Max's Crowd Surfing television advert.

"We'll Be Coming Back", featuring English singer and rapper Example, was released on 27 July 2012 as the fourth single from the album. It peaked at number two in the United Kingdom and number eight in Australia, while becoming both Harris's and Example's first solo single to reach number one in Ireland.

"Sweet Nothing" was released as the album's fifth single on 12 October 2012, featuring Florence Welch of English indie rock band Florence and the Machine. The song topped the charts in the UK and Ireland, becoming Harris and Welch's second collaborative number-one single, as well as the first UK chart-topper from 18 Months. It also debuted and peaked at number two in both Australia and New Zealand. In the US, the single peaked at number 10 on the Billboard Hot 100. "Sweet Nothing" was nominated for Best Dance Recording at the 56th Grammy Awards in 2014.

"Drinking from the Bottle" was released as the album's sixth official single on 27 January 2013, featuring English rapper Tinie Tempah. The song reached number five in the UK and number nine in Ireland.

"I Need Your Love", which features English singer Ellie Goulding, was released on 12 April 2013 as the seventh single from the album. The track reached number four in the UK and number six in Ireland, while charting inside the top five in countries such as Australia, Austria, Finland and Sweden. When "I Need Your Love" reached the UK top five in April 2013, Harris made chart history by becoming the first artist to attain eight top-10 singles from one studio album (including "We Found Love"), overtaking the record previously set by Michael Jackson.

"Thinking About You", featuring Ayah Marar, was released on 2 August 2013 as the album's eighth and final single. It reached number eight in the UK, number 11 in Ireland, number 28 in Australia and number 40 in New Zealand.

Promotional singles
"Awooga" was released on 21 March 2011 through Harris's label Fly Eye Records. The accompanying music video consists of footage from his then-recent concerts in Australia.

Harris's collaboration with Nicky Romero, "Iron", was released on Beatport on 10 September 2012 by Protocol Recordings.

Critical reception

18 Months received generally mixed reviews from music critics. At Metacritic, which assigns a normalised rating out of 100 to reviews from mainstream publications, the album received an average score of 57, based on 17 reviews. Fraser McAlpine of BBC Music hailed the album as a "collection almost exclusively in the key of triumph", as well as "a portfolio of win for Calvin, an annual report where the graph is almost all peaks and the troughs are so far down they're practically invisible." Arwa Haider of Metro commented that "18 Months could be a capsule collection of smash singles, yet it also works brilliantly as an album. That's partly because these are never faceless anthems; its singers [...] are well judged and rise to the songs, while the catchy hooks are lovingly arranged". AllMusic's Tim Sendra wrote that the album "shows Harris to be a solid producer with an easily identifiable sound." Mikael Wood of the Los Angeles Times noted that despite the variety of male collaborators, the album "only deepens the impression that Harris is best when linked with a lady; his skills in that area are several times more developed than they are anywhere else." The Independents Andy Gill was unimpressed by Ellie Goulding's performance on "I Need Your Love", but complimented Welch on "Sweet Nothing", and cited Harris's collaboration with Nicky Romero on "Iron" as the album's "killer cut".

Emily Mackay of NME opined that "[t]he best collaborations stand alone, but the rest demands small hours and sweat to animate it", stating the album "feels more like a deserved victory lap than a forward step or a new instalment, but apart from his sole vocal on 'Feel So Close', the victor seems oddly absent." Killian Fox of The Observer remarked, "Nothing else on 18 Months matches up to the blockbusting collaborations with Kelis, Florence Welch and Rihanna", concluding that "Harris's production has become increasingly homogenised and, despite the array of vocalists, everything here risks sounding the same." At Entertainment Weekly, Melissa Maerz complimented songs like "We Found Love" and "I Need Your Love", but found that the album does not offer "many surprises". Despite referring to Harris as a "brilliant pop craftsman", The A.V. Clubs Chris DeVille felt that the album "suffers from EDM fatigue" and that "almost every track eventually congeals into the same automaton thud." Evan Sawdey of PopMatters critiqued that "while 18 Months [...] is pretty much the hit-making monster that launched [Harris] in to the world spotlight, the truth of the matter is that it feels like a rather compromised vision of who he is an artist, sacrificing his quirkiness for a brooding new persona that starts to get stale over the course of a complete full-length." The Guardian critic Rebecca Nicholson expressed that "Harris knows how to make the most of his guests, leading them through a series of euphoric bangers that seem destined for success. But for all the pop divas he has roped in, there's a veneer of cynical, laddy EDM, resulting in the kind of tracks Skrillex might come up with on an Ayia Napa booze cruise."

Commercial performance
18 Months debuted at number one on the UK Albums Chart with first-week sales of 52,356 copies, becoming Harris's second consecutive number-one album on the chart. The album fell to number four the following week, selling 34,734 copies. In its third week, it slipped to number nine with 24,689 units sold. In mid-January 2013, the album returned to number one for one week before slipping to number two. By July 2017, 18 Months had sold 923,861 copies in the United Kingdom.

In the United States, 18 Months sold 17,000 copies to debut at number 19 on the Billboard 200 and at number one on the Dance/Electronic Albums chart, becoming Harris's first album to enter the former chart. As of March 2014, it had sold 173,000 copies in the US. 18 Months had also sold over 25 million singles worldwide as of August 2013.

Track listing

Notes
  signifies a vocal producer

Personnel
Credits adapted from the liner notes of 18 Months.

Musicians

 Calvin Harris – arrangement ; all instruments ; vocals 
 Kelis – vocals 
 Rihanna – vocals 
 Example – vocals 
 Nicky Romero – arrangement, all instruments 
 Ellie Goulding – vocals 
 James F. Reynolds – all instruments 
 Mark Knight – all instruments 
 Tinie Tempah – vocals 
 Florence Welch – vocals 
 Dillon Francis – all instruments 
 Dizzee Rascal – vocals 
 Ne-Yo – vocals 
 Ayah Marar – vocals

Technical

 Calvin Harris – production ; mixing 
 Simon Davey – mastering 
 Mike Marsh – mastering 
 Kuk Harrell – vocal production, vocal recording 
 Marcos Tovar – vocal recording 
 Phil Tan – mixing 
 Scott McCormick – engineering 
 Nicky Romero – production 
 Karen Thompson – mastering 
 James F. Reynolds – production 
 Mark Knight – production 
 Kid Harpoon – vocal recording 
 Dillon Francis – production

Charts

Weekly charts

Year-end charts

Decade-end charts

Certifications

Release history

Notes

References

2012 albums
Albums produced by Calvin Harris
Albums produced by Dillon Francis
Albums produced by Nicky Romero
Albums recorded at Westlake Recording Studios
Calvin Harris albums
Columbia Records albums
Ultra Records albums